Paula Ackerman (December 7, 1893 – January 12, 1989) was the first woman to perform rabbinical functions in the United States, leading the Beth Israel congregation in Meridian, Mississippi from 1951–53 (making her the first woman to assume spiritual leadership of a U.S. mainstream Jewish congregation) and the Beth-El congregation in Pensacola, Florida briefly in the 1960s. She led the National Committee on Religious Schools for the National Federation of Temple Sisterhoods.

Early life
Born as Paula Herskovitz in Pensacola, Florida, she married Rabbi William Ackerman in 1919.

She led the congregation at the Temple Beth Israel in Meridian, Mississippi. She had led services before, when her husband was absent or ill.

She continued to lead the congregation until a replacement was found in September 1953, although she was never formally ordained.

Regarding her chances of being selected for the job, Ackerman wrote to a friend, "I also know how revolutionary the idea is—therefore it seems to be a challenge that I pray I can meet. If I can just plant a seed for the Jewish woman's larger participation—if perhaps it will open a way for women students to train for congregational leadership—then my life would have some meaning." A woman would not be ordained in Reform Judaism until 1972, when Sally Priesand was formally made a rabbi. Ackerman later performed services at her home temple, Temple Beth-El in Pensacola, from 1962 until a replacement was found nine months later.

Later life and death
In 1981, Ackerman moved from Pensacola to Atlanta, Georgia. She died in Thomaston, Georgia on January 12, 1989, aged 95.

Legacy
In 1986 the Union of American Hebrew Congregations held a ceremony at The Temple in Atlanta to recognize Ackerman's contribution to Jewish communal life.

Some of Ackerman's papers are held in the American Jewish Archives, in Cincinnati, Ohio.

The novel The Rabbi Is a Lady (1987) by Alex J. Goldman, was likely inspired by Ackerman's life story. In the novel, the widow of a conservative rabbi who is appointed to her late husband's pulpit. The work is also one of the earliest inclusions of women rabbis as literary figures to appear in American Jewish literature.

See also
Regina Jonas
Sally Priesand
Amy Eilberg

Further reading
Umansky, Ellen M. "Reform's Lost Woman Rabbi: An Interview with Paula Ackerman." Genesis 2, no. 17 (June/July 1986) 3: 18–20

References

External links
 Shuly Rubin Schwartz, From Rebbetzin to Rabbi: The Journey of Paula Ackerman, American Jewish Archives Journal, 2007. 
 Ellen M. Umansky, Paula Ackerman 1893 – 1989, an entry in Jewish Women: A Comprehensive Historical Encyclopedia.

American Reform rabbis
1893 births
1989 deaths
People from Pensacola, Florida
People from Meridian, Mississippi
Reform women rabbis
1951 in Judaism
20th-century American rabbis
Women rabbis and Torah scholars